There were a number of independent candidates in the 2014 Ontario provincial election, none of whom were elected.  Some of these candidates have their own biography pages; information on others may be found here.

Candidates

Don Valley West: Brock Burrows

Eglinton—Lawrence: Erwin Sniedzins

Glengarry—Prescott—Russell: Marc-Antoine Gagnier

London—Fanshawe: Ali Aref Hamadi

Mississauga—Brampton South: Robert Alilovic

Nipissing: Patrick Clement

Perth—Wellington: Matthew Murphy

Peterborough: Brian Martindale

Renfrew—Nipissing—Pembroke: Chad Beckwith-Smith

Scarborough Southwest: Jean-Baptiste Foaleng

Sudbury: J. David Popescu

Windsor West: Helmi Charif

York South—Weston: Abi Issa

York West: Wally Schwauss

By-election candidates

References

2014